Remy is a census-designated place (CDP) in Sequoyah County, Oklahoma, United States. It is part of the Fort Smith, Arkansas-Oklahoma Metropolitan Statistical Area. The population was 411 at the 2000 census.

Geography
Remy is located at  (35.465402, -94.490135).

Demographics

As of the census of 2000, there were 411 people, 151 households, and 128 families residing in the CDP. There were 164 housing units at an average density of 12.7/sq mi (4.9/km2). The racial makeup of the CDP was 86.62% White, 9.49% Native American, 0.73% from other races, and 3.16% from two or more races. Hispanic or Latino of any race were 1.46% of the population.

There were 151 households, out of which 32.5% had children under the age of 18 living with them, 72.8% were married couples living together, 6.6% had a female householder with no husband present, and 14.6% were non-families. 11.9% of all households were made up of individuals, and 3.3% had someone living alone who was 65 years of age or older. The average household size was 2.72 and the average family size was 2.89.

In the CDP, the population was spread out, with 27.7% under the age of 18, 7.5% from 18 to 24, 25.5% from 25 to 44, 28.2% from 45 to 64, and 10.9% who were 65 years of age or older. The median age was 37 years. For every 100 females, there were 99.5 males. For every 100 females age 18 and over, there were 99.3 males.

The median income for a household in the CDP was $34,688, and the median income for a family was $38,125. Males had a median income of $31,761 versus $26,500 for females. The per capita income for the CDP was $16,869. About 12.5% of families and 10.4% of the population were below the poverty line, including 9.9% of those under age 18 and 10.0% of those age 65 or over.

References

Census-designated places in Sequoyah County, Oklahoma
Census-designated places in Oklahoma
Fort Smith metropolitan area